The League of American Bicyclists (LAB), officially the League of American Wheelmen, is a membership organization that promotes cycling for fun, fitness and transportation through advocacy and education.
A Section 501(c)(3) nonprofit organization, the League is one of the largest membership organizations of cyclists in the United States.

History

Founded in Newport, Rhode Island, on May 30, 1880, as the League of American Wheelmen by Kirk Munroe and Charles E. Pratt, it soon became the leading national membership organization for cyclists in the United States. The organization's first officers were Charles E. Pratt as president, T.K. Longstreet as vice president, O.S. Parsons as corresponding secretary, J.F. Furrell as recording secretary, and H.L. Willoughby as treasurer. The board of directors consisted of two from each state having regularly organization clubs.

Pratt served two terms as the organization's first president, from 1880 to 1882. He was the athor in 1879 of the first cycling guidebook in the United States, The American Bicycler: a manual for the observer, the learner and the expert.

The League was also the governing body for amateur bicycle racing in the U.S. during the late 19th century. Membership peaked at 103,000 in 1898.

The 1880–1902 period 

The League was a prominent advocacy group for the improvement of roads and highways in the United States long before the advent of the automobile. The Good Roads Movement in the late 19th century was founded and led by the League, which began publishing Good Roads magazine in 1892.

In the mid-1890s, bicycling became accessible to the population at large with the advent of the mass-produced, chain-driven safety bicycle. A huge boom in bicycle sales occurred, then collapsed as the market became saturated. Bicycle manufacturers were no longer able to support the League financially, and the interest of its members, largely well-to-do hobbyists, turned elsewhere.

In 1894, the League voted to prohibit membership by non-white people, pushed by southern members. Since the League was the governing body for bicycle racing at that time, the League's action effectively banned non-white people from most races in the United States. Local clubs had some discretion, as well as a separate racing league being set up, yet racism was still prevalent. Efforts were made the following years to repeal the "white exclusive" clause, an 1895 amendment to reverse the decision was dropped, as a "continued and energetic resistance" ensued before the original League dissolved in 1902. In 1999, a reformed League disavowed the 1894 action.

At its height in 1898, the League had over 103,000 members. Early members included three of the wealthiest men of the Gilded Age: Newport socialites John Jacob Astor, Diamond Jim Brady, and John D. Rockefeller.

Amateur bicycle racing declined with the rise of professional racing. League membership declined to 76,944 in 1900 and only 8,692 in 1902. The League dissolved that year, when there were still only a very few motorized vehicles on the roads. The American Automobile Association was founded the same year, 1902, and was, to an extent, a successor organization. It provided—and still provides—route information to members, as the League had provided. The League's Secretary, Abbott Bassett, produced a monthly publication under the League's name until 1924, but there was no League organization. Bassett's Scrap Book covered topics such as Frank W. Weston's role in developing cycling in Boston.

The 1939–1955 revival 
Bicycle club activity revived and was particularly strong in the Chicago area during the Great Depression of the 1930s. Attempts to revive the League were initiated by representatives of the bicycle industry in 1933 and continued through the 1930s, and consisted primarily of a number of exhibitions and races under the League's name. Chicago-area bicycle clubs formed the core of a revived League governed by recreational cyclists in 1939 and which adopted a constitution in April 1942. This incarnation of the League was primarily a social organization, holding group rides and annual conventions. World War II contributed to the success of the League through rationing of motor vehicle fuel and tires. Membership was 614 in 1945, with 200 honorary members in the armed services. However, in the late 1940s, the League went into decline. Factors included the increasing availability of motor vehicles; the "baby boom", which made for difficulties in pursuing recreational cycling; narrow highways; and conformist social attitudes, with a perception of bicycling as a children's activity. Membership was only 507 in 1950 and 238 in 1953. The League dissolved again in 1955.

1965–present 
The League reorganized once again in 1965. By this time, highways had improved, the Eisenhower Interstate Highway System had drained traffic from many of them, and new interest in recreational cycling was spurred by the promotion of sports bicycles with derailleur gearing by the Schwinn Bicycle Company and others. Increasing awareness of the importance of physical fitness also contributed to the popularity of bicycling.

Through the end of the 20th century, the League existed as a national clearinghouse for cycling advocacy, but more so as a social organization, holding three or more regional rallies each year, usually in June, centered on public college campuses in various parts of the US. Each of these rallies featured mapped rides of various lengths, dormitory housing and meals, a variety of cycling-related lectures, and vendors selling products. At their peak, rallies would each attract as many as 2,000 cyclists.

With increasing popularity of bicycling, however, various other organizations adopted functions which the League dropped or did not pursue—most prominently, Bikecentennial (later renamed as the Adventure Cycling Association), which maps touring routes and provides services for touring bicyclists; the Rails-to-Trails Conservancy, which promotes conversion of abandoned rail lines to trails; and the Alliance for Biking and Walking (formerly Thunderhead Alliance), a loosely organized consortium of state and local advocacy organizations which maintains communication over the Internet.

In the late 20th century, the League was criticized for its name: League of American Wheelmen. Also, the term Wheelmen was becoming increasingly obscure. In response, the League began doing business as the League of American Bicyclists in 1994.

The League reached a peak of 24,000 paid memberships in 1997, then declined to around 20,000, where it has remained since (as of 2009), though it is able to cite larger numbers by using a multiplier for family memberships and counting the approximately 300,000 members of affiliated bicycle clubs and advocacy organizations.

The League's rallies became less successful as bicyclists became able to find similar events closer to home. Beginning in 2003, the League would no longer organize its own rallies, but rather, would designate an existing event in one part of the country or another as its National Rally.

A major change in the direction of the League occurred in 1997 when it moved its offices from Baltimore, Maryland, to Washington, D.C., and focused increasingly on advocacy at the federal level. The League has shed most of the services it once provided to individual members, other than its magazine, and now is primarily an advocacy organization. Its major annual event is now the National Bicycle Summit (which see, under Advocacy, below).

The League has continued to play a leading role in cycling issues into the 21st century. One example is the certification of cycling instructors, since the 1970s. The League's education program concentrates on practical bicycle handling and traffic skills, and has more than 1,000 active instructors as of 2009. The League's Bicycle Friendly America program distributes awards to communities which have adopted measures to accommodate and encourage bicycle use. The League manages liability insurance programs for its instructors and for bicycle clubs, an invaluable service to them.

Advocacy
LAB is the voice for cyclists at the national level, and organizes an annual National Bike Summit to bring professionals and advocates in Washington, D.C., together with government representatives. A major supporter of the event is the PeopleForBikes Coalition (renamed from Bikes Belong Coalition in 2013), a §501(c)(6) trade association for the bicycle industry which lobbies Congress for funds to build bicycle usage in the U.S. The Summit has attracted around 500 attendees in recent years (as of 2009).

In addition to PeopleForBikes, LAB works in partnership with other organizations such as America Bikes ("leveraging federal transportation dollars for bicycling", primarily with PeopleForBikes money), the Alliance for Bicycling and Walking (lobbies for government money to encourage bicycle usage while receiving substantial industry funding), Federal Highway Administration, the National Highway Traffic Safety Administration (NHTSA), NCUTCD and NCUTLO in order to "create a more bicycle-friendly America".

Education
The League offers cycling education for adults and children in many locations across the U.S. Originally the education consisted of a single Effective Cycling (EC) course developed by John Forester and given to the League in 1976. Later, citing poor attendance and blaming the 30-hour length of the EC course, the League developed a curriculum consisting of multiple shorter courses. Forester did not agree with some of the changes to the program and withdrew permission for the League to use the EC name. The name of the League's program was then changed to "Bike Ed". In 2008, the program was renamed "Smart Cycling".

In addition to sponsoring the biennial "Bicycle Education Leaders Conference", the League is active in "Safe Routes to School" programs at a national level.

Bicycle-friendly communities
, the League has formally recognized 450 communities across all 50 states as bicycle-friendly communities for "providing safe accommodation and facilities for bicyclists and encouraging residents to bike for transportation and recreation." These are the communities:

Diamond-level
No Diamond-level communities.

Platinum-level - 5 Communities
Boulder, Colorado
Davis, California
Fort Collins, Colorado
Madison, Wisconsin
Portland, Oregon

Gold-level - 33 Communities
Ashland, Oregon
Austin, Texas
Bellingham, Washington
Bloomington, Indiana
Breckenridge, Colorado
Cambridge, Massachusetts
Carbondale, Colorado
Chico, California
Corvallis, Oregon
Crested Butte, Colorado
Durango, Colorado
Eugene, Oregon
Fayetteville, Arkansas
Hilton Head Island, South Carolina
Jackson and Teton County, Wyoming
Menlo Park, California
Minneapolis, Minnesota
Missoula, Montana
Palo Alto, California
Park City, Utah
San Francisco, California
San Luis Obispo, California
Santa Cruz, California
Scottsdale, Arizona
Seattle, Washington
Somerville, Massachusetts
Steamboat Springs, Colorado
Tempe, Arizona
Tucson, Arizona
Urbana, Illinois
The Villages, Florida
Washington, DC
Wood River Valley, Idaho

Silver-level - 90 Communities
Ada County, Idaho
Alexandria, Virginia
Anchorage, Alaska
Ann Arbor, Michigan
Appleton, Wisconsin
Arcata, California
Arlington, Virginia
Arvada, Colorado
Aspen, Colorado
Battle Creek, Michigan
Beaverton, Oregon
Bend, Oregon
Boise, Idaho
Bozeman, Montana
Burlington, Vermont
Calistoga, California
Carrboro, North Carolina
Champaign, Illinois
Charlottesville, Virginia
Chattanooga, Tennessee
Chicago, Illinois
Claremont, California
Coeur d'Alene, Idaho
Colorado Springs, Colorado
Columbia, Missouri
Coronado, California
Cottonwood, Arizona
Denver, Colorado
Ellensburg, Washington
Emeryville, California
Evanston, Illinois
Fitchburg, Wisconsin
Flagstaff, Arizona
Folsom, California
Gainesville, Florida
Glenwood Springs, Colorado
Golden, Colorado
Grand Marais, Minnesota
Gresham, Oregon
Gunnison, Colorado
Henderson, Nevada
Hennepin County, Minnesota
Houghton, Michigan
Iowa City, Iowa
Irvine, California
LaCrosse, Wisconsin
Las Vegas, Nevada
Logan, Utah
Long Beach, California
Longmont, Colorado
Louisville, Kentucky
Marquette, Michigan
Mesa, Arizona
Miami Beach, Florida
Moab City & Grand County, Utah
Mountain View, California
Nantucket, Massachusetts
New Orleans, Louisiana
New York City
Oakland, California
Oceanside, California
Philadelphia, Pennsylvania
Port Townsend, Washington
Provincetown, Massachusetts
Provo, Utah
Redmond, Washington
Sacramento, California
Salida, Colorado
Salt Lake City, Utah
Sanibel, Florida
Santa Barbara, California
Santa Fe, New Mexico
Santa Monica, California
Sedona, Arizona
Shorewood, Wisconsin
Simsbury, Connecticut
Sitka, Alaska
Solana Beach, California
South Bend, Indiana
South Lake Tahoe, California
St. Louis, Missouri
St. Paul, Minnesota
St. Petersburg, Florida
Summit County Government, Colorado
Tallahassee, Florida
Vail, Colorado
Venice, Florida
West Sacramento, California
Winter Park, Florida
York, Pennsylvania

Bronze-level - 324 Communities
Akron, Ohio
Alameda, California
Albany, Oregon
Albuquerque, New Mexico
Ames, Iowa
Anacortes, Washington
Arlington, Massachusetts
Arroyo Grande, California
Asheville, North Carolina
Athens, Georgia
Athens, Ohio
Atlanta, Georgia
Auburn, Alabama
Aurora, Illinois
Baltimore, Maryland
Batavia, Illinois
Bath, Maine
Baton Rouge, Louisiana
Bellevue, Washington
Bemidji, Minnesota
Bentonville, Arkansas
Bethesda, Maryland
Bettendorf, Iowa
Bethlehem, Pennsylvania
Billings, Montana
Bismarck-Mandan, North Dakota
Boca Raton, Florida
Boone, North Carolina
Brentwood, California
Brookings, South Dakota
Brookline, Massachusetts
Broward County, Florida
Brownsville, Texas
Brunswick, Maine
Buffalo, New York
Camp Hill, Pennsylvania
Cape Coral, Florida
Carbondale, Illinois
Carmel, Indiana
Carrollton, Georgia
Carson City, Nevada
Cary, North Carolina
Castle Rock, Colorado
Cedar Falls, Iowa
Cedar Rapids, Iowa
Chandler, Arizona
Chapel Hill, North Carolina
Charlotte, North Carolina
Chula Vista, California
Cincinnati, Ohio
Clackamas County, Oregon
Clark County, Nevada
Clayton, Missouri
Clermont, Florida
Cleveland, Ohio
Cleveland Heights, Ohio
Columbia, Maryland
Columbia, South Carolina
Columbus, Georgia
Columbus, Indiana
Columbus, Ohio
Concord, New Hampshire
Conway, Arkansas
Coralville, Iowa
Crosby, Minnesota
Cupertino, California
Dane County, Wisconsin
Davidson, North Carolina
Dayton, Ohio
Decatur, Georgia
DeKalb, Illinois
Des Moines, Iowa
Doral, Florida
Dover, Delaware
Dublin, Ohio
Duluth, Minnesota
Durham, North Carolina
East Lansing, Michigan
Eastern Placer County, California
Eau Claire, Wisconsin
Edina, Minnesota
El Paso, Texas
Elmhurst, Illinois
Essex Junction, Vermont
Eureka, California
Fairfax County, Virginia
Falmouth, Massachusetts
Fargo, North Dakota-Moorhead, Minnesota
Farmington, Connecticut
Fergus Falls, Minnesota
Ferguson, Missouri
Fernandina Beach, Florida
Flint, Michigan
Fort Wayne, Indiana
Fort Worth, Texas
Franklin, Pennsylvania
Frazee, Minnesota
Bronze-level, continued
Frederick, Maryland
Fresno, California
Frisco, Texas
Gilbert, Arizona
Glastonbury, Connecticut
Glenview, Illinois
Goshen, Indiana
Grand Junction, Colorado
Grand Rapids, Michigan
Grand Rapids, Minnesota
Greater Grand Forks, South Dakota-Minnesota
Greater Mankato, Minnesota
Greater Wenatchee MPO, Washington
Greeley, Colorado
Greensboro, North Carolina
Greenville, South Carolina
Gulf Shores, Alabama
Hagerstown, Maryland
Hanover, New Hampshire
Harrisonburg, Virginia
Hartford, Connecticut
Hattiesburg, Mississippi
Healdsburg, California
Helena, Montana
Highland Park, Illinois
Hoboken, New Jersey
Honolulu, Hawaii
Houston, Texas
Hudson, Ohio
Huntington Beach, California
Hutchinson, Minnesota
Indianapolis, Indiana
Indian River County, Florida
Inverness, Florida
Ithaca, New York
Jackson, Minnesota
Jamestown S'Klallam Tribe of Washington
Jekyll Island, Georgia
Juneau, Alaska
Kalamazoo, Michigan
Kansas City, Missouri
Keene, New Hampshire
Kenmore, Washington
Key Biscayne, Florida
Kirkland, Washington
Knoxville, Tennessee
Lakeland, Florida
Lakewood, Colorado
Lakewood, Ohio
Lambertville, New Jersey
Lansing, Michigan
Laramie, Wyoming
Las Cruces, New Mexico
Lawrence, Kansas
Lebanon, New Hampshire
Lee's Summit, Missouri
Lewes, Delaware
Lexington-Fayette County, Kentucky
Lexington, Massachusetts
Liberty Lake, Washington
Lima, Ohio
Lincoln, Nebraska
Little Rock, Arkansas
Los Alamos, New Mexico
Los Altos, California
Los Angeles, California
Manhattan, Kansas
Mansfield, Connecticut
Memphis, Tennessee
Menomonie, Wisconsin
Mesquite, Nevada
Miami, Florida
Miami-Dade County, Florida
Miami Shores, Florida
Middleton, Wisconsin
Midland, Michigan
Milledgeville, Georgia
Milton, Massachusetts
Milwaukee, Wisconsin
Monona, Wisconsin
Montclair, New Jersey
Montpelier, Vermont
Morgantown, West Virginia
Morro Bay, California
Moscow, Idaho
Muncie, Indiana
Napa, California
Naperville, Illinois
Naples, Florida
Nashville, Tennessee
New Britain, Connecticut
New Brunswick, New Jersey
New Haven, Connecticut
New Ulm, Minnesota
Newark, Delaware
Newport, Rhode Island
Newton, Massachusetts
Norfolk, Virginia
Normal, Illinois
Norman, Oklahoma
North Little Rock, Arkansas
Northampton, Massachusetts
Northwest Arkansas-Benton and Washington Counties
Oak Park, Illinois
Oberlin, Ohio
Ocean City, New Jersey
Ogden, Utah
Omaha, Nebraska
Onalaska, Wisconsin
Orange County, California
Orem, Utah
Orlando, Florida
Oxford, Mississippi
Paso Robles, California
Peachtree City, Georgia
Phoenix, Arizona
Piqua, Ohio
Pittsburgh, Pennsylvania
Plano, Texas
Pleasanton, California
Port Angeles-Clallam County, Washington
Portage, Michigan
Portsmouth, New Hampshire
Portsmouth, Virginia
Prescott, Arizona
Princeton, New Jersey
Pueblo, Colorado
Raleigh, North Carolina
Rancho Cordova, California
Rancho Cucamonga, California
Reading, Pennsylvania
Redding, California
Redondo Beach, California
Redwood City, California
Reno-Sparks, Washoe County, Nevada
Reston, Virginia
Richardson, Texas
Richfield, Minnesota
Richmond, Virginia
Ridgeland, Mississippi
River Falls, Wisconsin
Riverdale, Utah
Riverside, California
Roanoke, Virginia
Rochester, Minnesota
Rochester, New York
Rock Hill, South Carolina
Rockville, Maryland
Rogers, Arkansas
Roseburg, Oregon
Roseville, California
Roswell, Georgia,
Salem, Oregon
Salisbury, Maryland
San Antonio, Texas
San Carlos, California
San Diego, California
San Jose, California
San Mateo, California
San Mateo County, California
San Buenaventura, California
Santa Clara, California
Santa Clarita, California
Santa Rosa, California
Savannah, Georgia
Schaumburg, Illinois
Sequim, Washington
Shaker Heights, Ohio
Shawnee, Kansas
Sheboygan, Wisconsin
Sierra Vista, Arizona
Silverthorne, Colorado
Sioux Falls, South Dakota
Snohomish, Washington
Sonoma, California
South Lake County, Florida
South Miami, Florida
South San Francisco, California
South Sioux City, Nebraska
South Windsor, Connecticut
Spartanburg, South Carolina
Spokane, Washington
Springboro, Ohio
Springfield, Illinois
Springfield, Missouri
Springfield, Oregon
State College - Centre Region, Pennsylvania
Stevens Point, Wisconsin
Stillwater, Oklahoma
Sturgeon Bay, Wisconsin
St. Cloud, Minnesota
St. George, Utah
St. Louis Park, Minnesota
Sturgeon Bay, Wisconsin
Sunnyvale, California
Tacoma, Washington
Tampa, Florida
Temecula, California
The Woodlands, Texas
Thousand Oaks, California
Topeka, Kansas
Troy, Ohio
Tulsa, Oklahoma
Tybee Island, Georgia
University Heights, Iowa
Vancouver, Washington
Vienna, Virginia
Virginia Beach, Virginia
Wake Forest, North Carolina
Walla Walla, Washington
Warrenville, Illinois
Warsaw & Winona Lake, Indiana
Washington, Illinois
Watsonville, California
Wausau, Wisconsin
West Hartford, Connecticut
West Windsor, New Jersey
Westerville, Ohio
Weston, Florida
Wichita, Kansas
Williamsburg, Virginia
Willmar, Minnesota
Wilmette, Illinois
Wilmington, North Carolina
Windsor, California
Winona, Minnesota
Winston-Salem, North Carolina
Woodland, California
Yellow Springs, Ohio
Ypsilanti, Michigan
Yuma, Arizona
Zionsville, Indiana

Bicycle-friendly universities
, the league has formally recognized 208 universities across 47 states and Washington, D.C., as bicycle-friendly institutions of higher education for "promoting and providing a more bikeable campus for students, staff and visitors." These are the universities:

Platinum-level - 8 Schools
Colorado State University - Fort Collins, Colorado
Portland State University - Portland, Oregon
Stanford University - Stanford, California
University of California, Davis - Davis, California
University of California, Irvine - Irvine, California
University of California, Santa Barbara - Santa Barbara, California
University of Minnesota - Twin Cities, Minnesota
University of Wisconsin–Madison - Madison, Wisconsin

Gold-level - 24 Schools
Arizona State University - Tempe, Arizona
Boise State University - Boise, Idaho
Dartmouth College - Hanover, New Hampshire
Dickinson College - Carlisle, Pennsylvania
Georgia Institute of Technology - Atlanta, Georgia
Harvard University - Cambridge, Massachusetts
Northern Arizona University - Flagstaff, Arizona
Oregon Health & Science University - Portland, Oregon
Oregon State University - Corvallis, Oregon
Purdue University - West Lafayette, Indiana
University of Arkansas - Fayetteville, Arkansas
University of Arizona - Tucson, Arizona
University of California, Berkeley - Berkeley, California
University of California, Los Angeles - Los Angeles, California
University of Colorado Boulder - Boulder, Colorado
University of Kentucky - Lexington, Kentucky
University of Maryland - College Park, Maryland
University of Montana - Missoula, Montana
University of Oregon - Eugene, Oregon
University of Utah - Salt Lake City, Utah
University of Vermont - Burlington, Vermont
University of Washington - Seattle, Washington
University of Wisconsin–Milwaukee - Milwaukee, Wisconsin
Yale University - New Haven, Connecticut

Silver-level - 62 Schools
Arkansas State University - Jonesboro, Arkansas
Auburn University - Auburn, Alabama
Brigham Young University - Provo, Utah
California State University, Long Beach - Long Beach, California
California State University, Sacramento - Sacramento, California
Carnegie Mellon University - Pittsburgh, Pennsylvania
Champlain College - Burlington, Vermont
Clemson University - Clemson, South Carolina
Coastal Carolina University - Conway, South Carolina
College of William & Mary - Williamsburg, Virginia
Columbia University - New York City
Duke University - Durham, North Carolina
East Carolina University - Greenville, North Carolina
Emory University - Atlanta, Georgia
Florida State University - Tallahassee, Florida
George Mason University - Fairfax, Virginia
Grand Valley State University - Allendale, Michigan
Illinois Wesleyan University - Bloomington, Illinois
Indiana University - Bloomington, Indiana
Keene State College - Keene, New Hampshire
Lees-McRae College - Banner Elk, North Carolina
Louisiana State University - Baton Rouge, Louisiana
Loyola University Chicago - Chicago, Illinois
Macalester College - St. Paul, Minnesota
Massachusetts Institute of Technology - Cambridge, Massachusetts
Michigan State University - East Lansing, Michigan
Morehead State University - Morehead, Kentucky
North Carolina State University - Raleigh, North Carolina
Northwestern University - Evanston, Illinois
Pennsylvania State University - University Park, Pennsylvania
Santa Monica College - Santa Monica, California
School of the Art Institute of Chicago - Chicago, Illinois
Southern Oregon University - Ashland, Oregon
Temple University - Philadelphia, Pennsylvania
Texas A&M University - College Station, Texas
Texas Tech University - Lubbock, Texas
University of Alaska Fairbanks - Fairbanks, Alaska
University of California, Santa Cruz - Santa Cruz, California
University of Colorado Colorado Springs - Colorado Springs, Colorado
University of Florida - Gainesville, Florida
University of Illinois at Chicago - Chicago, Illinois
University of Illinois Urbana-Champaign - Urbana-Champaign, Illinois
University of Iowa - Iowa City, Iowa
University of La Verne - La Verne, California
University of Louisville - Louisville, Kentucky
University of Massachusetts Lowell - Lowell, Massachusetts
University of Michigan - Ann Arbor, Michigan
University of Michigan-Flint - Flint, Michigan
University of Nebraska - Lincoln, Nebraska
University of North Carolina at Chapel Hill - Chapel Hill, North Carolina
University of North Carolina, Wilmington - Wilmington, North Carolina
University of Oklahoma - Norman, Oklahoma
University of Pennsylvania - Philadelphia, Pennsylvania
University of Rochester - Rochester, New York
University of South Carolina - Columbia, South Carolina
University of South Florida - Tampa, Florida
University of Virginia - Charlottesville, Virginia
Utah State University - Logan, Utah
Virginia Commonwealth University - Richmond, Virginia
Washington University in St. Louis - St. Louis, Missouri

Bronze-level - 114 Schools
Alfred University - Alfred, New York
American University - Washington, DC
Appalachian State University - Boone, North Carolina
Aquinas College - Grand Rapids, Michigan
Arizona State University, Downtown Campus - Phoenix, Arizona
Arizona State University, Polytechnic Campus - Mesa, Arizona
Arizona State University West campus - Glendale, Arizona
Bemidji State University - Bemidji, Minnesota
Bentley University - Waltham, Massachusetts
Black Hills State University - Spearfish, South Dakota
Boston University - Charles River campus - Boston, Massachusetts
Boston University Medical Campus - Boston, Massachusetts
Brown University - Providence, Rhode Island
California Polytechnic State University - San Luis Obispo, California
California State University, Bakersfield - Bakersfield, California
California State University, Monterey Bay - Seaside, California
Bronze-level, continued
California State University, Northridge - Northridge, California
Catholic University of America - Washington, DC
Chatham University - Pittsburgh, Pennsylvania
College of Charleston - Charleston, South Carolina
Colorado College - Colorado Springs, Colorado
Columbus State University - Columbus, Georgia
Concordia University - Moorhead, Minnesota
Emporia State University - Emporia, Kansas
Florida Institute of Technology - Melbourne, Florida
Franklin & Marshall College - Lancaster, Pennsylvania
George Mason University Arlington campus - Arlington, Virginia
Georgetown University - Washington, DC
Georgia College & State University - Milledgeville, Georgia
Hendrix College - Conway, Arkansas
Illinois Institute of Technology - Chicago, Illinois
James Madison University - Harrisonburg, Virginia
Kansas State University - Manhattan, Kansas
Kennesaw State University - Kennesaw campus - Kennesaw, Georgia
Kennesaw State University - Marietta campus - Marietta, Georgia
Kent State University - Kent, Ohio
Knox College - Galesburg, Illinois
Lawrence Technological University - Southfield, Michigan
Loyola Marymount University - Los Angeles, California
Minnesota State Community and Technical College Fergus Falls - Fergus Falls, Minnesota
Miami University - Oxford, Ohio
Michigan Technological University - Houghton, Michigan
Minnesota State University, Mankato - Mankato, Minnesota
Monroe Community College - Rochester, New York
Montana State University - Bozeman, Montana
Montgomery County Community College - Pottstown, Pennsylvania
Naropa University - Boulder, Colorado
Nazareth College - Rochester, New York
New Mexico State University - Las Cruces, New Mexico
Norfolk State University - Norfolk, Virginia
North Carolina Central University - Durham, North Carolina
Northern Michigan University - Marquette, Michigan
Ohio University - Athens, Ohio
Oklahoma State University - Stillwater, Oklahoma
Old Dominion University - Norfolk, Virginia
Pennsylvania College of Technology - Williamsport, Pennsylvania
Pomona College - Claremont, California
Princeton University - Princeton, New Jersey
Rice University - Houston, Texas
Rochester Institute of Technology - Rochester, New York
Salisbury University - Salisbury, Maryland
San Francisco State University - San Francisco, California
Savannah College of Art and Design - Savannah, Georgia
Shippensburg University - Shippensburg, Pennsylvania
Southern Illinois University - Carbondale, Illinois
St. Lawrence University - Canton, New York
University at Buffalo, The State University of New York - Buffalo, New York
State University of New York at Cortland - Cortland, New York
SUNY College of Environmental Science and Forestry - Syracuse, New York
State University of New York at Stony Brook - Stony Brook, New York
Texas State University - San Marcos, Texas
The College at Brockport, State University of New York - Brockport, New York
Towson University - Towson, Maryland
Transylvania University - Lexington, Kentucky
Truman State University - Kirksville, Missouri
Tufts University - Medford and Somerville, Massachusetts
University of Alabama at Birmingham - Birmingham, Alabama
University of California, San Diego - San Diego, California
University of Central Arkansas - Conway, Arkansas
University of Central Florida - Orlando, Florida
University of Central Oklahoma - Edmond, Oklahoma
University of Cincinnati - Cincinnati, Ohio
University of Dayton - Dayton, Ohio
University of Denver - Denver, Colorado
University of Georgia - Athens, Georgia
University of Illinois Springfield - Springfield, Illinois
University of Kansas - Lawrence, Kansas
University of Louisiana at Lafayette - Lafayette, Louisiana
University of Memphis - Memphis, Tennessee
University of Miami - Coral Gables, Florida
University of Mississippi - Oxford, Mississippi
University of Missouri-Kansas City - Kansas City, Missouri
University of Nevada, Reno - Reno, Nevada
University of New England - Biddeford, Maine
University of New Mexico - Albuquerque, New Mexico
University of North Carolina, Charlotte - Charlotte, North Carolina
University of North Carolina, Greensboro - Greensboro, North Carolina
University of North Texas - Denton, Texas
University of Northern Colorado - Greeley, Colorado
University of Pittsburgh - Pittsburgh, Pennsylvania
University of San Diego - San Diego, California
University of South Florida St. Petersburg - St. Petersburg, Florida
University of Texas at Austin - Austin, Texas
University of Toledo - Toledo, Ohio
University of Tulsa - Tulsa, Oklahoma
University of West Georgia - Carrollton, Georgia
University of Wisconsin–Eau Claire - Eau Claire, Wisconsin
University of Wisconsin–La Crosse - La Crosse, Wisconsin
University of Wisconsin–Stevens Point - Stevens Point, Wisconsin
University of Wisconsin-Stout - Menomonie, Wisconsin
University of Wyoming - Laramie, Wyoming
Vanderbilt University and Vanderbilt University Medical Center - Nashville, Tennessee
Washtenaw Community College - Ann Arbor, Michigan
West Virginia University - Morgantown, West Virginia

Formerly designated
Bowdoin College - Brunswick, Maine
Lincoln Memorial University - Harrogate, Tennessee
California Institute of Technology - Pasadena, California
Carroll University - Waukesha, Wisconsin
Cornell University - Ithaca, New York
Eastern Mennonite University - Harrisonburg, Virginia
Green Mountain College - Poultney, Vermont
Gustavus Adolphus College - St. Peter, Minnesota
Oberlin College - Oberlin, Ohio
Ohio State University - Columbus, Ohio
Virginia Tech - Blacksburg, Virginia
Western Kentucky University - Bowling Green, Kentucky

See also
 Phyllis Harmon
 Albert Augustus Pope
San Francisco Bicycle Coalition
Sacramento Area Bicycle Advocates

References

External links

 LAB website
 Bicycle Friendly Communities, another LAB website
 wbgu.org WBGU-PBS local documentary "Bicycling Through The Past"
 League of American Bicyclists records, 1880-2012, bulk 1965-1996, University Archives and Special Collections, Joseph P. Healey Library, University of Massachusetts Boston
 LAB Reform historical comments on the LAB.

Political advocacy groups in the United States
Cycling organizations in the United States
501(c)(3) organizations
History of cycling in the United States
1880 establishments in Rhode Island
Sports organizations established in 1880
Non-profit organizations based in Washington, D.C.